Thirty Seconds of Love (Italian:Trenta secondi d'amore) is a 1936 Italian romantic comedy film directed by Mario Bonnard and starring Nino Besozzi, Elsa Merlini and Enrico Viarisio.

Cast

References

Bibliography 
 Matilde Hochkofler. Anna Magnani. Gremese Editore, 2001.

External links 
 

1936 films
1936 romantic comedy films
Italian romantic comedy films
1930s Italian-language films
Films directed by Mario Bonnard
Italian black-and-white films
1930s Italian films